Union Deportiva Guadalajara Fútbol Sala is a futsal club based in Guadalajara, city of the province of Guadalajara in the autonomous community of Castile-La Mancha.

The club was founded in 2000 and its pavilion is Multiusos de Guadalajara with capacity of 1,600 seaters.

The club has the sponsorship of Gestesa.

The club filed for bankruptcy in September 19, 2012, being subsequently disbanded.

Season to season

6 seasons in División de Honor
5 seasons in División de Plata
1 seasons in Segunda División B

Former players
  Juanra

References

External links
Official website

Futsal clubs in Spain
Sports teams in Castilla–La Mancha
Futsal clubs established in 2000
Sports clubs disestablished in 2012
2000 establishments in Spain
2012 disestablishments in Spain
Sport in Guadalajara, Spain